Cerralvo may refer to:
 Cerralvo Municipality
 Ciudad Cerralvo
 Rodrigo Pacheco, 3rd Marquis of Cerralvo
 Cerralvo Island